Ejen Ali, is a Malaysian animated series produced by WAU Animation, focusing on a titular boy which accidentally became an agent after using Infinity Retinal Intelligent System (I.R.I.S), a device prototype created by the Meta Advance Tactical Agency (M.A.T.A). I.R.I.S is controlled by neuro-signals enabling the wearer to perform actions programmed by the computer. After the incident, Ali and his uncle, Bakar, cooperate in M.A.T.A missions.

The series is published in HDTV format and was first broadcast on TV3, on 8 April 2016. Ejen Ali is the first animation series as the intellect property of Media Prima Berhad (MPB).

Background

Setting
The series is set in the fictional city of Cyberaya, largely based on the actual town of Cyberjaya, located approximately halfway between Kuala Lumpur and its international airport. In the series, Cyberaya was shown to be a technologically advanced city, much as the real-life Cyberjaya had envisioned. 

In episode MISI: MAIN, Cyberaya was shown to have a rapid transit system.

Organization
The series revolves around M.A.T.A. (Meta-Advance Tactical Agency), a paramilitary Pinkerton-style spy agency, made up of four company-sized units known as pillars.

Production
The idea of creating the animated series came for Usamah Zaid Yasin, the director and scriptwriter, after establishing WAU Animation in 2013. For the storyline, he and his team watched films, animated series and read novels about spy and intelligence. The making of Ejen Ali took two years before the production works started in July 2015. About the name chosen in the series, Usamah said that Ali is a simple name and frequently used in textbooks. They were confused about choosing a simple name and finally, Ali was chosen. Unlike any animated TV series in Malaysia, the end credits of the series were written in English instead of Malay, just like BoBoiBoy.

At first, Wau Animation planned to make Ejen Ali as a feature film project, but because of difficulties securing investment and after discussing with many parties and some feedbacks, they felt that it is a loss if they only produce a single movie as the concept is so wide. They planned to develop this series at least until 5 seasons, then the films will follow. Eventually, they released their first movie after 2 seasons, which was released on 28 November 2019.

Characters

Main
 Ali Ghazali
Voiced by: Ida Rahayu Yusoff (Malay); McKenzie Atwood (season 3) (English)
 Ali bin Ghazali is a lazy school-going boy with a lack of complete maternal love for his only best friend Viktor. He lives with his father who happens to be a tech prodigy of Cyberjaya. In seasons 1 and 2, and the movie, Ali's primary gadget is the "Infinity Retinal Intelligent System" or "I.R.I.S", which he accidentally wielded while being struck into pursuit by Dos. Since the gadget had scanned Ali's iris for the first time, it was permanently conjoined with his optical biometric interference. He used I.R.I.S until he unlocks its hidden "Override mode", which performed on higher capabilities but would keep Ali unconscious during the time. Ali would make a device mirroring to the original named IRIS Atlas, which evolved to become IRIS Neo. Due to misuses and defects, he was officially separated from the original gadget. His other devices included his yo-yo (gives an impacted blast), aero boots (for boosts like hovering and high jump), and a magnetic suit, introduced in season 3. He was originally a techno agent but he is a combat agent starting episode 8 of season 3.

 Bakar
Voiced by: Shafiq Isa (Malay); Bill Butts (season 3) (English)
 Bakar is Ali's uncle, a combat M.A.T.A agent, and a younger brother to Ali's late mother. He has a tough body and is excellent at fighting. He is always caring for Ali. He usually fights physically and wears gauntlets that can activate a plasma shield to defend himself from enemy attacks. Bakar was framed as the "enemy's spy" when a CCTV camera showed him sending the data of the I.R.I.S blueprint to the enemies. However, Ali finds out that Bakar's brain was controlled after receiving a strange phone call from Dr. Aaron, causing him to do so. In season 2, he became a mentor in the Combat Pillar.

 Alicia Kheng
Voiced by: Noorhayati Maslini Omar (Malay); Lizzie Freeman (season 3) (English)
 An adopted daughter of General Rama, she is a Chinese-Indian young agent from the Neuro Pillar and Ali's classmate. She is first introduced as the 'Masked Menace', who wears jet-black clothing and a full-face helmet, and helps Ali to defeat the enemies at the port. Alicia initially hates working in M.A.T.A together with Ali. Due to her egoism and Ali's stubbornness, they always fight and this makes them rivals. After Ali saved her from the Azurium explosion, she developed a more caring and friendly personality towards Ali. She can be quite hostile sometimes. After saving Ali from Uno and Jenny (Cinco), she is trying her best to protect I.R.I.S from being taken by the enemies. Her weapon is a slingshot that is used to shoot various metal balls. Some deal damage, some function as smoke bombs, and some use fictional gravitational magnet-like forces to attract enemies. She was an inviso agent starting episode 8 of season 3.

 General Rama
 Voiced by: Azman Zulkiply
 The fierce general of M.A.T.A. and adopted father of Alicia. He always chants "Bertindak Segera!" (Malay for "Act Immediately!") every time he is instructing the agents to immediately proceed to their assigned missions. A running gag in the series is that whenever the agents are being noisy whilst his presence, he screams "Dey!" that echoes throughout the room.

Rizwan
Voiced by: Azman Zulkiply (Malay); Johnny Yong Bosch (season 3) (English)
Rizwan is the greatest agent of M.A.T.A, of the Inviso Pillar. He can disguise as someone else by putting on a cap. He is often seen with lollipop in his mouth, thus always uses the lollipop stick as his final shot. His gloves can temporarily disable the enemies' nervous system. In season 2, he betrayed M.A.T.A and joined the Numeros, before it was later revealed that he was negotiating with Uno to end the rivalry with M.A.T.A (which ends in failure). In season 3, he was being treated at Professor Akram's hideout to remove Azurium and nanobots implanted by Jenny (Cinco), and it was shown that he was immune to nanobots as almost all were removed from his bodies. He is now partnered with Dos to track and capture both Cinco and Trez. 

Comot
Voiced by: Ida Rahayu Yusoff (Malay); Kayli Mills (season 3) (English)
 Ali's pet cat. Initially mistaken as Labu, Ali's previous cat who ran away from home after the death of his mother. She used to work for Abang Bear and was requested to steal I.R.I.S, but she betrayed him as she doesn't want to be abused anymore. As a subject of illegal pet experiments three years ago, her genetics have been modified which gives her a camouflage capability. She is heterochromatic in her eyes. She had fought Kim after seeing her planting spy devices and transmitting the location ouside. She was believed to be killed by her, but returns in episode 12. 

Dos (2)
Voiced by: Nurul Radhiah Ibrahim (Malay); Anne Yatco (season 3) (English)
Dos is the former member of Numeros. During her days at Numeros, she together with her former partner Trez, broke into M.A.T.A's headquarters and stole I.R.I.S. Her weapon is a taser hair ornament which can electrocute her target and plasma blades that are capable of cutting through anything. She wears a pair of special boots that enables super speed and agility. In the end of the movie, it was shown that she had joined Rizwan and assisted in finding Cinco who escaped in season 3.

Numeros
The Numeros are the main antagonists of season 1 and season 2; their mission is to retrieve I.R.I.S and seek vengeance against M.A.T.A. Their name literally means numbers in Spanish; the members' code names are simply Spanish numerals. So far, there are only nine Numeros members, with four of them had their real name revealed. Two of them, Cuatro (4) does not want to work with Numeros anymore, although he was forced to do so and Dos (2) who were spared by M.A.T.A. after several Numeros were arrested and she was given a second chance to redeem herself to become Rizwan's partner in season 3. 

Uno (1)
Voiced by: Azuan Wanji Shamsir
Uno is the leader of Numeros, with the main objective to retrieve I.R.I.S. It was later revealed that he was the former Leader of Inviso Pillar, whose real name was Djin, who was Rizwan's mentor and was rumoured to be killed in an Azurium explosion following their mission against terrorists which nearly threatens to destroy Cyberaya. He feels betrayed by the other Pillar Leaders who neglected him 5 years ago, which led to his grudge against M.A.T.A. He is able to move at super speed and is very agile while fighting. His weapon is a plasma sword. In the finale episode of season 2, he died in the laser satellite attack after he overrides M.A.T.A Academy's defense mainframe to destroy the place along with the agents and also kills Zain in the explosion.

Trez (3)
Voiced by: Megat Zahrin Megat Hisham
Trez is a big-bodied man with cybernetic arms that enable him to lift a load 10 times heavier than a normal human. 

 Cinco (5) 
 Voiced by: Nor Meirysha Nurol Ashikin (Malay); Kimberly Woods (season 3) (English)
 Cinco's real name is Jenny and is previously M.A.T.A's special inventor. She created weapons, suits, and devices for the M.A.T.A agents. As Jenny, she appears as a soft-spoken and gentle woman who always shows her concern towards the agents. She revealed herself to be the enemies' spy and never sided with M.A.T.A. as Cinco in the 12th episode of season 1 as she is responsible for the research in order to separate I.R.I.S from Ali. She is always seen holding a tablet with its pen, in which the pen functioned as a taser and communicator. In season 2, it was realized that every Numeros member (except Uno) was implanted with the special nanobots (similar to that being of Ocho) and she could control the neural system to make the victim work in her command. In season 3, it is revealed that she replaced Uno as Numeros' leader and underwent a bionic arm replacement of her left hand, which now possessed a sharp talon-like palm and nanobots hidden under her shoulder and arms. In season 3 at the start of episode 8, It is believed that she and Kim were orphans and were abused because of Kim's love for music.

Seis and Siete (6 and 7)
Voiced by: Iliyas Abdull Latif
A pair of twins who share the same weapon, a football that produces high impact when it is kicked to the target. In the third episode of season 3, they were shown to work for Brother Bear.

Ocho (8)
Voiced by: Shafiq Isa
Ocho is a robot who is the master of the microbugs. His movements and attacks using the microbugs are controlled by Cinco.

Nueve (9)
Voiced by: Adi Bahari
Nueve's real name is Dr. Aaron, previously a scientist at Alpha Tower and worked under Dr. Tong. He is a mad scientist with the mission to advance humanity. Dr. Aaron invented NeuroGear, a helmet that can control a human's mind, and his invention is rejected by Dr. Tong before he gets fired. He was imprisoned and created NeuroLink, in order to transfer the data of Dr. Tong's brain to his own brain. After being successfully defeated by Ali and his team, he was kidnapped by Dos and Trez, in which he later became the member of Numeros and invented the I.R.I.S Separator.

M.A.T.A Training Academy agents
Jet
Voiced by: Mohammed Haziq Mohammed Hilmy (Malay); Christian Banas (season 3) (English)
A self-proclaimed young agent of the Neuro pillar who is able to fly with his weapon, a jetpack. He was eliminated from M.A.T.A. along with Bulat and Moon in season 3.

Moon
Voiced by: Ain Hafizah (Malay); Francesca Calo (season 3) (English)
A cheerful and chatty young agent of the Inviso pillar. She is one of the young agents who is very friendly toward Ali. Moon can produce her own clones with her suits that can project holograph images of her. Her weapon is a pair of gloves that causes impact shocks to anything she touches. She was eliminated along with Bulat and Jet in season 3.

Iman
Voiced by: Salina Salmee Mohd Ali (Malay); Rogin Rashidan (season 3) (English)
A hijabi young agent from the Combat Pillar. She appears as a shy and highly-mannered girl but is very friendly towards Ali. Her weapon is a roped dart. She's an Inviso agent in season 3.

Khai
Voiced by: Khairul Anwar Suwandi (Malay); Khoi Dao (season 3) (English)
A Japanese-Malay young agent of the Techno Pillar who befriends Ali at the academy. His weapon is his robotic hoverboard named R-O. He tends to chant "Naisu!" (Japanese for "nice!") every time he is praising his friend's good works. Similar to Alicia, he can be quite hostile sometimes. He's a combat agent along with Ali in season 3. 

Rudy
Voiced by: Syahrul Matnizam (Malay); Aaron Phillips (season 3) (English)
A cold-hearted and arrogant young agent of the Inviso Pillar. He holds deep hatred towards Ali after learning that Ali defeated Uno in the finale episode of season 1. Rudy always fights with Ali. Before becoming an M.A.T.A agent, he was a pickpocket and lived in an alley. He idolized Djin (Uno) very much after he saved him from being tormented by Komeng. It is also revealed that he lost his family. He can control the movement of his target if he puts, a pair of metal wristbands on their wrists. Rudy is also able to disguise as anyone he desires by putting on his disguising hoodie.

Mika
Voiced by: Shafiqah Zulkefli (Malay); Anjali Kunapaneni (season 3) (English)
A tomboyish young agent of the Combat Pillar. She is disabled on her legs, thus, she possesses a mecha suit as her weapon. It enables her to move around and shields herself from enemy attacks. Just like Alicia, she can be quite hostile sometimes. She's a neuro agent in season 3.

 Roza
Voiced by: Syuhadah Hysham (Malay); Anne Yatco (season 3) (English)
 A Sarawakian young agent of the Neuro Pillar who bullied Ali at the academy. She is always seen chewing bubblegum. Her weapon is a sniper rifle that fires lasers. In season 3 episode 7, she was injured as she was saving a child from getting hit by a fallen planet in the science museum and in episode 8 she was eliminated.
Bulat
Voiced by: Muhammad Aqil (Malay); Anthony Sardinha (season 3) (English)
A chubby young agent of the Techno Pillar. His weapon is a rubix sphere that has different functions, depending on its combination such as creating explosions, a barrier and confetti. In season 3 , he was eliminated along with jet and moon.

Zass
A mute young agent of the Inviso Pillar with the ability to run at super speed. In season 3 epi 8 he was eliminated .

Chris
Voiced by: Iqbal Mustaqim Johnny Yong Bosch (season 3) (English)
A white agent of the Combat pillar who speaks Kelantanese dialect. His weapons are plasma kris that are controlled with telekinesis. Chris fights with silat styles and chants.

International agents
Aleksander "Aleks" Zakariiev
Voiced by: Shafiq Isa (Malay); Harry Wood (English)
 A big-bodied Inviso agent that can move with super speed by anti-gravity or stand rock firm on the ground using his special suit that manipulates gravity around the wearer. He was eliminated in episode 8 . He refers to himself in third-person.

 Rizka Widjaya
Voiced by: Azi Shafian (Malay); Tiana Camacho (English)
A hot-headed Kombat agent who speaks in Indonesian accent and possesses a pair of plasma karambit. She's a techno agent in season 3.

 Samuel "Sam" Thompson, Jr. 
 Voiced by: Hakim Kamal (Malay); Kyle McCarley (English)
 A self-propelled and smart Neuro agent, who mocked the juniors, especially Ali. He possesses a military-grade Swiss watch that fires lasers, secretly spy on others and act as a commutator.

 Kimberly "Kim" Song
 Voiced by: Nur Atika Abdullah (Malay); Kayli Mills (English)
 A cheerful and music-loving Techno agent, whose weapon is a modified and upgraded keytar. In episode 8 she planted one of her earrings in the computer in the Techno lab and at the end, it is believed that Kim and Cinco are working together to hack the defense system in the new M.A.T.A Academy. 

 Lily
 An acrobatic, purple-dyed hair Kombat agent who wields Nunchaku as her weapon.

Mentor agents
Leon
Voiced by: Muhammad Zulhilmi (Malay); Dino Andrade (Season 3) (English)
Leon is the mentor of Neuro Pillar and is the strictest of them.

Geetha
Voiced by: Azi Shafian (Malay); Shara Kirby (season 3) (English)
Geetha is the mentor of Techno Pillar. She is also known as the friendliest mentor agents at all. However, she can also be more strict than Leon when there is a student who is not listening to her.

Karya
Voiced by: Usamah Zaid Yasin (Malay); Anthony Sardinha (season 3) (English)
Karya is the mentor of Inviso Pillar. Outside of M.A.T.A, he works as a teacher at Ali's school, under the name Cikgu Bidin, who 'chose' Ali as a member of the Stamp Collecting Club. He is able to perform magic tricks and hypnosis.

Pillar leaders
Zain
Voiced by: Usamah Zaid Yasin
Zain is the leader of Neuro Pillar, who helped found M.A.T.A. When the other pillar leaders did not trust Ali after the Override Mode incident, he is the only one who trust him and guides Ali. He was also secretly mentoring Alicia & Ali. In the finale episode of season 2, it was reported that he was killed after he sacrifices himself in stopping Djin and his minions during the attack on M.A.T.A Academy.

Ganz
Voiced by: Shafiq Isa (Malay); Zeke Alton (Season 3) (English)
Ganz is the leader of Combat Pillar. He is quick-tempered.

Dayang
Voiced by: Aina Nadzir (Malay); Rogin Rashidan (season 3) (English)
Dayang is the leader of Techno Pillar, and also one of Zain's closest associates, including recognition and training Ali's main potential during on the Academy. She also recruited Ali's mother 15 years ago, after they investigated the raid on Cyberaya's main cargo bay and stopping them as well.

Other antagonists
 Wak Musang
 A nasi lemak seller who works under Abang Bear. In the first episode of season 1, he is shown to work with the Numeros, when he is responsible for temporarily keeping I.R.I.S for Uno.

 Abang Bear
 The puppet behind Comot's illegal experiment 3 years ago who uses genetically modified cats like her to rob money and gold for him. He speaks the Kelantanese dialect. In episode 4 of season 1, he planted a bomb in the warehouse to kill Ali, Alicia, and Bakar as he steals the I.R.I.S. saying he's selling it but Comot attacks him and takes it from him by biting his wrist. He tries to run after Comot but Komeng stops him saying the bomb was about to blow. Then he leaves with the other cats except for Comot. 

 Komeng
 Commander of the Bear gang, who always seeks to steal high technological devices from C-Tech.

 Neonimus
 An unknown entity who hacked into the station control room of the Cyberjaya transit system.

 Analog Man
 An old man who dislikes technology and plans to destroy Cyberjaya. He said that advanced technologies caused the values of humanity to be forgotten. In the 10th episode of season 2, he was arrested but escaped with the help of some guys dressed as construction workers. He planned to bomb the bridge in Cyberjaya but Ali, Alicia, Moon, and Bakar stopped him. But he planted a Bomb known as the mother bomb above the bridge to kill Ali and his team. Although they stopped the bomb from destroying the bridge. He escaped and is unknown if he will return to cause danger to Cyberjaya or not.

Other characters
 Victor
 Voiced by: Azman Zulkiply
 Victor is the classmate and best friend of Ali, who enjoys playing video games together with him. Unlike Ali, he is academically excellent and often ranked 2nd in the class. 

 Puan Munah
 Voiced by: Roshilawati Razlan
 The strict homeroom teacher of 6 Avicenna. She teaches Science, P.E. and Math subjects and is often seen holding a rattan whip. Although small-bodied, her scream could terrify her students.

 Dr. Tong
 A scientist in the biotechnology branch and former employer of Dr. Aaron. He became the victim of Dr. Aaron when the data of his brain is transferred into Dr. Aaron's brain.

 Dr. Mala
 A scientist in the energy engineering branch.

 Dr. Ghazali
Voiced by: Usamah Zaid Yasin (Malay); Harry Wood (season 3) (English)
 Father of Ali who is a technological prodigy. 

 Aliya
 Voiced by: Salina Salmee Mohd Ali (Malay); Shara Kirby (season 3) (English)
 Deceased mother of Ali and the older sister of Bakar. Her identity was revealed in Ejen Ali: The Movie, where she teamed up with a slum girl from the outskirts of Cyberjaya, Niki, to help people in poverty. She created small inventions for their daily use and then started to steal technology for the backward' benefits. The turning point comes in her life when she and Niki tried to steal advanced equipment from a cargo bay but were intervened by the core pillar leaders. After being defeated in the fight, Aliya forces Niki to escape alone after being cornered. Just as Niki watches, Dayang (after being impressed by the courage and inventions of Aliya) offers her to join M.A.T.A, which is the reason for Niki's betrayal. In a later scene, Niki plans to loot the city's resources and then decides to destroy it and launches three missiles from the center; but Aliya arrives and fails to stop Niki. In the end, she uses the I.R.I.S Override Mode to clash the missiles in mid-air but died after the successful attempt.

 Prof. Akram
 Voiced by: Shafiq Isa (Malay); David Sabalov (English)
 Originally Cuatro (4) of the Numeros, he lives alone in a small house located in a remote forest. He refused to work under Numeros as he does not want to trust Uno anymore. However, Cinco threatens him to work together with them or else the life of his family will be at stake.

 Dato' Hisham
 Voiced by: Usamah Zaid Yasin (Malay); Ryan Colt Levy (English)
A sporty and scientific researcher, who succeeded Othman as the next mayor of Cyberaya.

Julia
Voiced by: Sarah Azman (Malay); Francesca Calo (English)
The personal assistant of Dato' Hisham.

Episodes

Broadcast
Aside from airing on TV3 in Malaysia, Ejen Ali can also be streamed on Iflix (Season 1 only) and Netflix (all 2 seasons) in an English dub.

Outside Malaysia, Ejen Ali has been expanded and shown across over 50 different countries worldwide. In June 2020, Primeworks Studios announced that Ejen Ali, along with 5 other animated series produced by Primeworks Studios, will stream on Amazon Prime in 6 different countries namely: the United States, Canada, the United Kingdom, Ireland, Australia and New Zealand, as part of their deal between the Primeworks Studios subsidiary, Primeworks Distribution and Janson Media.

In May 2021, Primeworks Studios and WAU Animations approached with The Walt Disney Company in dealing to stream the said series on Disney+ Hotstar. In October 2021, they confirmed its co-production, revealing that the series would launch by around late 2021 to early 2022.

Season 1
The first episode was broadcast on 8 April 2016, with the second and third episodes shown on 15 April and 22 April respectively. It is shown every Friday, at 5:30 p.m. on TV3. Fourth, fifth and sixth episodes shown on 27 July, 29 July, and 5 August respectively. Seventh to ninth episodes are shown on 28 October 2016 for three consecutive weeks. Tenth to twelfth episodes are shown on 30 December 2016, 6 January and 13 January 2017. Thirteenth episode (last episode of Season 1) has been shown on 3 March.

An English dub of the show premiered 15 December 2017 on Disney Channel Asia and it was finished on 8 June 2018. It also premiered on Nickelodeon Sonic in India on 16 July 2018; however it was abruptly taken off the schedule nearly two weeks later due to low viewership. But on 5 November 2018, the new episodes were aired on Nick HD+ and the entire season was finished on 17 November 2018. The first season was aired till November 2018 To April 2020 On Nick HD+, The first season was aired till 17 months in India. After that they had cancelled the broadcasting of the Season 2, and later the movie, with having only Season 1 episodes aired in India.

Season 2
The first episode of Season 2 was broadcast 22 September 2017, with episode two, three and four shown on 29 September. 6 October and 13 October respectively. Just like Season 1, It is shown every Friday, at 5:30 p.m. on TV3, Fifth, sixth, seventh, eighth episodes shown on 17 November, 24 November, 1 December and 8 December respectively. Episode nine to eleven aired from 9 February to 23 February 2018. The twelfth episode was released on 23 March 2018. The thirteenth episode (last episode of Season 2) was released on 30 March, making 26 episodes total.

An English dub for Season 2 premiered 15 April 2019 on Disney Channel Asia and it was finished on 1 January 2020.

Season 3
Due to the insistent demand after three years since the end of the second season, it was announced that a third season has been confirmed with undergoing productions of the new episodes, as well as the release of a new teaser music of opening theme. A small teaser trailer was released on 14 October 2021, and a poster released on 28 November 2021, while its official trailer was released on 10 June 2022. It was voted to be most popular local animated series on ABPBH 34.

It is co-produced with Disney+ Hotstar and premiered on 25 June 2022 as announced through Disney+ Hotstar Malaysia's YouTube channel in the "June 2022 Highlights" video on the regional Southeast Asian version as they received lower viewership in India and instead focusing on the designated areas.

It was revealed on 3 August 2022 that it would be divided into two parts with the first part aired for 7 episodes from 25 June to 6 August while the second part is scheduled to release in December. The teaser trailer for part two was released on YouTube.

Soon after the release of its first episode, illegal torrents started to circulate on the Internet. On its official Twitter handle, it was requested to stop the piracy by submitting any illegal torrent link to them. The creators also requested people not to pest or threaten them to release the new season on other platforms. They assured to broadcast the series on other platforms or regions when available in future.

On 26 August 2022, the staff and casts for the English dub for Season 3 were announced. The ADR director is Michael Schneider, while the casting director is Rachel Slotky. It was produced by Reuben Lack and adapted by Emily Fajardo and Meli Grant. Annika Perkins was involved in spotting, while dialogue was edited by Brian Hubbard and John Montoya.

Controversy
It was discovered that several fans and fan bases were indulged into creating explicit/sexually inappropriate content of the characters; and were being circulated on social media. Official handles took a notice of this and asked the users not to encourage the wrong acts that "disgrace" the character's depiction and respect them to be as normal entities.

Reception

Awards and nominations

In other media

Video game
Before the release of Ejen Ali, WAU Animation with the collaboration with Media Prima Digital released its own game which is Ejen Ali: MATA Training Academy for Android and iOS users on 4 March 2016. The game was downloaded for over 260,000 times. The second game, Ejen Ali: Emergency was released for iOS and Android in September 2016. Ejen Ali: Emergency is co-produce with Malaysia video game company Common Extract after the company won a Game Jam organised by Media Prima Digital, Primeworks Studios, Wau Animation and Multimedia Development Corp.

Both games have succeeded to win medals in Mob-Ex Awards 2017. Ejen Ali: MATA Training Academy won three golds which were Best App - Creativity, Best App - Media Owner and Best App - Tablets and one bronze which was Best App - Games & Entertainment, while Ejen Ali: Emergency won one gold for Best App - Games and Entertainment and one bronze for Best App - Tablets.

In early 2020, WAU Animation with Media Prima Digital announced the releasing of a new game, "Ejen Ali: Agent's Arena"., which was to be available on Android, later iOS, but now it has been removed from most of the databases. It's already being played in Malaysia. Ejen Ali: Agents Arena is co-produce with Common Extract.

Film

After two seasons of animated TV series, WAU Animations produced its first film, titled Ejen Ali: The Movie, which was released on 28 November 2019 in Malaysia.
Endowed by success of the first film, Wau Animation is now setting itself in preparing the film's sequence.

Notes

References

External links
 
 

2010s animated television series
Malaysian children's animated action television series
Malaysian children's animated adventure television series
Malaysian children's animated science fiction television series
Espionage television series
